Stoilov is a surname. Notable people with the surname include:

Delcho Stoilov (born 1981), Bulgarian footballer
Konstantin Stoilov (1853–1901), Bulgarian politician
Petr Stoilov (born 1975), Czech footballer
Stanimir Stoilov (born 1967), Bulgarian footballer and manager
Stojanče Stoilov (born 1987), Macedonian handball player
Stoycho Stoilov (born 1971), Bulgarian footballer

Bulgarian-language surnames
Macedonian-language surnames